Lip sync, also  lip-sync, lip-synch and short for lip synchronization is a technical term for matching lip movements with pre-recorded sung or spoken vocals

Lip sync may also refer to:
Lip Sync Battle, American musical reality competition television program which spawned several international versions
Lip sync error in audio to video synchronization
Lip Synch (series), series of 5 short films which used vox pops as inspiration for their subject matter

See also
Lipps Inc. (pronounced like "lip sync"), American R&B/Funk/Disco band from Minneapolis, Minnesota, USA